Charlotte de la Gournerie (born January 15, 1989) is a French film producer. She has been nominated for her film Flee for the Best Documentary Feature and Best Animated Feature at the 94th Academy Awards.

Life and career 
Charlotte was born in France and grew up in Bretagne, Bordeaux and Paris where she graduated, in 2013, from the Gobelins Animation School. She started her career at Animation Sans Frontières, a workshop supported by Creative Europe, then she moved to Denmark to work as a producer. In 2015, she became partner at Sun Creature Studio. In 2020, she started Sun Creature France in Bordeaux.

Filmography 
As Producer

 The Reward: Tales of Alethrion - The First Hero  (2015)
 The Heroic Quest of the Valiant Prince Ivandoe (Season 1 - 2017)  
 The Heroic Quest of the Valiant Prince Ivandoe (Season 2 - 2021)
 Flee (2021)

Accolade(s)

Notes

External links 

 

French film producers
French women film producers
Film people from Paris
Living people
1989 births